Major-General Jeremy Julian Joseph Phipps  (30 June 1942 – 16 March 2021) was a British Army officer who served as Senior British Loan Services Officer in Oman.

Early life
Phipps was the son of a Royal Navy officer, Lieutenant Alan Phipps (1915–1943), who was killed ashore at the Battle of Leros, one of the sons of Sir Eric Phipps, a British diplomat descended from the first Earl of Mulgrave. His mother, Veronica Nell (née Fraser; 1920–2005) was a Roman Catholic, the daughter of Simon Fraser, 14th Lord Lovat. In 1946, she married secondly Brigadier Fitzroy Maclean, who raised Phipps, who was educated at Ampleforth and the Royal Military Academy Sandhurst.

Military career
Phipps was commissioned into the Queen's Own Hussars in 1960. He was serving in the Special Air Service during the Iranian Embassy siege in 1980 and was subsequently given command of the Queen's Own Hussars. He was appointed Commander of 11th Armoured Brigade in 1986, Director Special Forces in 1989 and Senior British Loan Services Officer in Oman in 1993 before retiring in 1997.

In retirement Phipps became a Director at Control Risks Group and, from 2002, head of security at the Jockey Club. He then was hired by Aegis Defence Services.

Death
Phipps died on 16 March 2021 at the age of 78.

A memorial mass was held for him on 30 September 2021 at the Brompton Oratory in London.

References

1942 births
2021 deaths
British Army generals
English people of Scottish descent
Queen's Own Hussars officers
Companions of the Order of the Bath
Graduates of the Royal Military Academy Sandhurst
People educated at Ampleforth College
Jeremy
British Roman Catholics
Special Air Service officers